Morteza Gholi Bayat (Mortezā Qoli Bayāt, aka Sahām al-Soltān, 1890–10 May 1958) was a Prime Minister of Iran.

Career

Born in Arak, Iran into a family of Irans' ancient tribal nobility, Chieftains of the Bayat tribe, to Haj Abbas Qoli-Khan Saham al-Molk Araki, he first founded the Democratic party of Arak.

He was heavily involved in the termination of the Qajar dynasty. In 1925, he became Minister of Finance under Prime Minister Mohammad Ali Foroughi. He was elected numerous times to the Parliament of Iran as a representative of Arak.

In 1935 he served as Minister of Treasury under Prime Minister Ali Soheili.

He introduced his cabinet as Prime Minister of Iran in 1944. His administration however only lasted 5 months and 20 days and was succeeded by Ebrahim Hakimi. He served as Minister again on a few other occasions.

The visit of Charles de Gaulle to Iran took place during his administration. Under the presence of the Allies in Iran, Tehran also declared war on Japan during his administration.

Death

He was buried in Najaf, Iraq.

See also
Pahlavi Dynasty
List of prime ministers of Iran

References

 'Alí Rizā Awsatí (عليرضا اوسطى), Iran in the Past Three Centuries (Irān dar Se Qarn-e Goz̲ashteh – ايران در سه قرن گذشته), Volumes 1 and 2 (Paktāb Publishing – انتشارات پاکتاب, Tehran, Iran, 2003).  (Vol. 1),  (Vol. 2).

20th-century Iranian politicians
1890 births
1958 deaths
Members of the National Consultative Assembly
Prime Ministers of Iran
People from Arak, Iran
Iranian Azerbaijanis
Reformers' Party politicians
National Iranian Oil Company people
Moderate Socialists Party politicians